Federal Records was an American record label founded in 1950 as a subsidiary of Syd Nathan's King Records and based in Cincinnati, Ohio. It was run by famed record producer Ralph Bass and was mainly devoted to Rhythm & Blues releases. The company also released hillbilly and rockabilly recordings from 1951 onward, e.g., "Rockin' and Rollin" by Ramblin' Tommy Scott on Federal 10003. Singles were published on both 45 and 78 rpm speed formats.

Federal issued such classics as The Dominoes' "Sixty Minute Man", and "Have Mercy Baby" as well as Hank Ballard & The Midnighters' "Work With Me, Annie"  which was opposed immediately by the Federal Communications Commission (FCC) but went on to be an enormous hit.

James Brown was touring with The Famous Flames when they were signed to Federal in 1956. The group's first Federal single, "Please, Please, Please," was a regional hit and eventually sold a million copies.

Between 1962 and 1965 Freddie King, one of the three Blues "kings" (Freddie, B.B. and Albert), released a series of albums, mostly instrumentals, for Federal.

Johnny "Guitar" Watson was another artist on Federal Records.

Selected discography

Singles

See also 
 List of record labels

References

External links 
 King/Federal/DeLuxe Story by David Edwards and Mike Callahan
 Federal Records on the Internet Archive's Great 78 Project

Record labels established in 1950
Defunct record labels of the United States
Soul music record labels
!